Jane Jensen (born Jane Elizabeth Smith; January 28, 1963 in Palmerton, Pennsylvania) is an American video game designer and author. She is mostly known as the creator of the Gabriel Knight series of adventure games, and also co-founded Oberon Media and Pinkerton Road video game development companies.  Jensen also writes under the name Eli Easton.

Early life
Jane Jensen was born Jane Elizabeth Smith, the youngest of seven children. She received a BA in computer science from Anderson University in Indiana and worked as a systems programmer for Hewlett-Packard.

Career
Her love of both computers and creative writing eventually led her to the computer gaming industry and Sierra OnLine where she worked as a writer on Police Quest III: The Kindred and EcoQuest: The Search for Cetus. After co-designing King's Quest VI: Heir Today, Gone Tomorrow with veteran game designer Roberta Williams, Jensen designed her first solo game: Gabriel Knight: Sins of the Fathers, which was released in 1993. The dark, supernatural mystery was a departure for Sierra but the game was enthusiastically received, with the strength of Jensen's writing, along with the game's horror and gothic sensibilities coming in for particular praise from the gaming press and earning the Computer Gaming World'''s "Adventure Game of the Year" award.

Jensen followed up Gabriel Knight: Sins of the Fathers with two sequels: The Beast Within: A Gabriel Knight Mystery in 1995 and Gabriel Knight 3: Blood of the Sacred, Blood of the Damned in 1999. Somewhat unusually for an adventure game series, each Gabriel Knight title was produced in an entirely different format to the others. Whereas the original was a traditional 2D animated game, the sequels were realised through full motion video and a custom built 3D engine, respectively. Despite further acclaim for Jensen's design in both cases (The Beast Within too was Computer Gaming World "Game of the Year"), the large expenses associated with making the sequels, coupled with the declining marketability of adventure games (especially within Sierra) meant that a fourth in the series was not commissioned.

In 1997, Jensen published a novelization of the first Gabriel Knight game. A second Gabriel Knight novelization followed in 1998. In 1999, Jensen published her first non-adapted novel, Millennium Rising (later retitled Judgment Day). Her fourth book, Dante's Equation was published in 2003 and was nominated for the Philip K. Dick Award.

Jensen has been involved in designing casual online games at Oberon Media, of which she is a co-founder. Her work in the hidden object/light adventure category can partially be credited with moving casual games in the direction of full adventure games in puzzle and story sophistication.  Some of her more notable recent games include Deadtime Stories (2009) and Dying for Daylight (2010). After leaving Oberon in 2011, she briefly worked at Zynga.

Jensen's next big adventure game Gray Matter was developed by Wizarbox and published by dtp entertainment in 2010. The game, originally intended to be developed by Hungarian software house Tonuzaba, switched to another developer, French company Wizarbox in 2008: as a result, the tentative release was changed and shifted to 2010. Jensen was also a story consultant on Phoenix Online Studios' 2012 adventure game Cognition: An Erica Reed Thriller.

On April 5, 2012, Jensen and her husband Robert Holmes announced the formation of Pinkerton Road, a new game development studio to be headquartered on their Lancaster, Pennsylvania farm. With this announcement, a Kickstarter campaign was launched to raise funds for the studio's first year of game development. In 2014, Pinkerton released their first games, Moebius: Empire Rising and Gabriel Knight: Sins of the Fathers 20th Anniversary Edition.

Since 2013, Jensen has written gay romance fiction under the pen name "Eli Easton". The Lion and the Crow was written for the Goodreads M/M Romance event "Love has No Boundaries" in 2013, and later expanded and rereleased as a second edition in e-book and audiobook.

Personal life
Jensen owned a farm in Pennsylvania where she lived with her husband, composer Robert Holmes, who composed the music for the Gabriel Knight series and Gray Matter. They have since sold the farm and are currently living in the Puget Sound area of Washington state.

Works
GamesEcoQuest: The Search for Cetus (1991) (writer)Police Quest III: The Kindred (1991) (writer)King's Quest VI: Heir Today, Gone Tomorrow (1992) (co-designer, co-writer)Space Quest IV: Roger Wilco and the Time Rippers (1992) (CD-ROM version) (voice actor)The Dagger of Amon Ra (1993) (CD-ROM version) (voice actor)Gabriel Knight: Sins of the Fathers (1993) (designer, director, writer)Pepper's Adventures in Time (1993) (designer)The Beast Within: A Gabriel Knight Mystery (1995) (designer, writer)Gabriel Knight 3: Blood of the Sacred, Blood of the Damned (1999) (designer, writer)Inspector Parker (2003) (designer)BeTrapped! (2004) (designer)Agatha Christie: Death on the Nile (2007) (designer, director)Agatha Christie: Peril at End House (2007) (designer, director)Women's Murder Club: Death in Scarlet (2007) (designer, director)Dr. Lynch: Grave Secrets (2008) (designer, director)Women's Murder Club: A Darker Shade of Grey (2008) (designer, director)Agatha Christie: Dead Man's Folly (2009) (creative director)Women's Murder Club: Twice in a Blue Moon (2009) (designer, director)Deadtime Stories (2009) (creator, designer, director)Gray Matter (2010) (designer, writer)Dying for Daylight (2011) (designer, director)Hidden Chronicles (2012) (co-writer)Cognition: An Erica Reed Thriller (2012–13) (story consultant)Moebius: Empire Rising (2014) (creator, designer, director, writer)Gabriel Knight: Sins of the Fathers 20th Anniversary Edition (2014) (creative director, designer)

NovelsGabriel Knight: Sins of the Fathers (Roc, 1997)The Beast Within: A Gabriel Knight Mystery (Roc, 1998)Millennium Rising (Judgment Day) (Del Rey, 1999)Dante's Equation (Del Rey, 2003)Kingdom Come - An Elizabeth Harris Novel (Berkley, 2016)In the Land of Milk and Honey - An Elizabeth Harris Novel (Berkley, 2016)

 Comic books Gabriel Knight: The Temptation (Phoenix Online Publishing, 2014–15)

 As Eli Easton 
"A Kiss in the Dark" (2013) (a novella part of Closet Capers anthology)Before I Wake (2013)The Lion and the Crow (2013)Superhero (2013)The Trouble with Tony (2013)Puzzle Me This (2013)
"Caress" (2013) (a novella part of Steamed Up anthology)Blame it on the Mistletoe (2013)A Prairie Dog’s Love Song (2013)The Enlightenment of Daniel (2013)
"Reparation" (2014) (a novella part of Stitch anthology)Heaven Can't Wait (2014)The Mating of Michael (2014)
"The Bird" (2014) (a novella part of Bones anthology)Unwrapping Hank (2014)A Midwinter Night's Dream (2015)
"Among the Dead" (2015) (a novella part of Spirit anthology)The Stolen Suitor (2016)A Second Harvest (2016)Falling Down (2016)Merry Christmas, Mr. Miggles (2016)How to Howl at the Moon (2015)How to Walk Like a Man (2015)How to Wish Upon a Star (2016)A Second Harvest (2016)How to Save a Life (2017)Tender Mercies (2017)Snowblind (2017)Five Dares (2017)Desperately Seeking Santa (2017)Robby Riverton: Mail Order Bride (2018)Boy Shattered (2018)Family Camp (2019)How to Run With the Wolves (2019)Angels Sing (2019)Christmas Angel (2019)The Redemption of River (2020)Billy and the Beast (2020)One Trick Pony (2021)Schooling the Jock (co-written by Tara Lain) (2021)Coaching the Nerd (co-written by Tara Lain) (2021)Head to Head (co-written by Tara Lain) (2021)Betting on his BF (co-written by Tara Lain) (2021)The Best Gift (2021)Hot Seat (co-written by Tara Lain) (2022)Hot Wings (co-written by Tara Lain) (2022)Hot Pursuit (2022)A Changeling Christmas (2022)12 Days of UPS'' (2022)

References

External links
 
 Official website of Eli Easton, Jane Jensen's pen name

Interviews
 Alternative Magazine Online Interviews Jane Jensen on Gray Matter, 2011
 Alternative Magazine Online interviews Jane Jensen on Gabriel Knight 20th Anniversary Remake, 2013
 Jane Jensen interview with GameSpot, 2007
 Jane Jensen interview on adventure games at Adventure Classic Gaming, 2003
 AdventureGamers interview

1963 births
20th-century American novelists
20th-century American women writers
21st-century American novelists
21st-century American women writers
American computer programmers
American mystery writers
American science fiction writers
American video game designers
American video game directors
American women novelists
Anderson University (Indiana) alumni
Creative directors
Living people
Novelists from Pennsylvania
People from Carbon County, Pennsylvania
People from Lancaster County, Pennsylvania
Sierra On-Line employees
Video game writers
Women mystery writers
Women science fiction and fantasy writers
Women video game designers